Oscar Daniel Guilfoil, Sr. (July 8, 1863 – December 23, 1955) was an American politician in the state of Washington. He served in the Washington State Senate from 1889 to 1891. He died at a hospital in Ogdensburg, New York in 1955, where he had lived the last 10 years of his life. His obituary in The Post-Standard erroneously stated his age at death as 100, as his family stated that his birth date was unknown. He was buried in Rhinebeck.

References

1863 births
1955 deaths
Republican Party Washington (state) state senators